The Beat Goes On is the third studio album by electronic music group Cash Cash. The full-length version was only licensed in Japan and the EP version was self-released worldwide on Cash Cash Music. It was released on September 7, 2012 and both formats contained the two songs "Michael Jackson (The Beat Goes On)" and "I Like It Loud," which were also soon after released as singles by Dutch independent dance label Spinnin' Records.

Background
Cash Cash released The Beat Goes On as an 11-song LP in Japan but as a 6-song EP in every other country. "Michael Jackson (The Beat Goes On)" was released as the lead single from the album on July 11, 2012. The second single "I Like It Loud" was released on September 7, 2012. Lyric videos were released for both singles on Spinnin' Records with the song "Michael Jackson (The Beat Goes On)" paying tribute to American singer Michael Jackson.

The album's initial release was supposed to be on June 13, 2012, however due to some new distribution plans, the group re-scheduled the release on September 7, 2012.

Commercial performance
The Beat Goes On peaked at number 163 on the Japanese Albums chart. The single "Michael Jackson (The Beat Goes On)" received airplay in Japan and the Netherlands and reached number 8 on the Dance Top 30 chart along with spending five weeks on the Dutch Top 40 chart.

Track listing

Charts

Singles

References

2012 albums
Cash Cash albums
Spinnin' Records albums